Senex is a Latin word literally meaning a man of old age. It may specifically refer to:
 Wise old man, an archetype
 Stock characters:
 senex amans, an old man unsuitably in love with a much younger woman
 senex iratus, an old man who irrationally opposes the love of the young couple
 Senex, a poem by Sir John Betjeman describing an older man's guilty, but harmless, pleasure in watching young women playing sports
 Senex, a character in the novel A Wind in the Door, a subcellular creature
 "Senex", a pen-name of Sir Alan Lascelles in 1950
 Senex Energy, an Australian company

See also 
 Cenex (disambiguation)
 Old man (disambiguation)
 Elder (disambiguation)